Elektro Kumbia are an American musical group from Corpus Christi, Texas, who play Mexican cumbia. The group was created by A.B. Quintanilla in 2016; it is the third band formed by Quintanilla, following Kumbia Kings and Kumbia All Starz.

Biography
A.B. Quintanilla previously created two bands, Kumbia Kings in 1999 and Kumbia All Starz in 2006. On June 16, 2016, it was announced A.B. Quintanilla had signed with DEL Records. On June 20, 2016, A.B. Quintanilla announced he will be forming a new band called Elektro Kumbia. Many members who were part of Kumbia All Starz during that time went on to join Quintanilla on his new band.

Band members
Current members
 A.B. Quintanilla – Leader, Bass Guitar, Backing Vocals, Producer (2016–present)
 Alfonso Ramirez – Vocalist (2016–present)
 Zuriel Ramirez – Vocalist (2016–present)
 Ramon Vargas – Vocalist (2016–present)
 Nicholas "Nick" Banda – Keyboards (2016–present)
 Ruben Rea – Guitar (2016–present)
 Lissenne "Liz" Juárez – Congas, Percussion, Backing Vocals (2016–present)
 Saul Cisneros, Jr. – Drums (2016–present)

Discography

Studio albums
 Elektro Kumbia (2017)

Singles
 "Piña Colada Shot" (2017)
 "La Aventura" (2017)
 "Pasito Tun Tun" (2017)

References

External links
 Official Facebook
 

Musical groups established in 2016
A. B. Quintanilla
Cumbia musical groups
Kumbia All Starz
Kumbia Kings
Mexican musical groups
Musical groups from Texas
Latin pop music groups
2016 establishments in Texas